2020 in television may refer to
 2020 in American television for television related events in the United States.
 List of 2020 American television debuts for television debut related events in the United States.
 2020 in Australian television for television related events in Australia.
 2020 in British television for television related events in Great Britain.
 2020 in Scottish television for television related events in Scotland.
 2020 in Canadian television for television related events in Canada.
 2020 in Estonian television for television related events in Estonia.
 2020 in Irish television for television related events in Ireland.
 2020 in Japanese television for television related events in Japan.
 2020 in Philippine television for television related events in the Philippines.
 2020 in South Korean television for television related events in South Korea.

 
Mass media timelines by year